Ryan Sanusi (born 5 January 1992) is a Belgian professional footballer who plays as a midfielder for Beerschot.

Career
In July 2013, Sanusi joined up with Championship side Queens Park Rangers for their pre-season tour of Devon. He played around 18 minutes in a pre-season friendly against Exeter City, which ended goalless.

Personal life
Born in Belgium, Sanusi is of Nigerian descent.

Honours

Club
Sparta Rotterdam
 Eerste Divisie: 2015–16

References

External links

 
 
 
 Voetbal International profile 

1992 births
Living people
People from Borgerhout
Footballers from Antwerp
Association football midfielders
Belgian footballers
Belgium youth international footballers
Black Belgian sportspeople
Belgian people of Nigerian descent
Belgian expatriate footballers
Willem II (football club) players
TOP Oss players
Sparta Rotterdam players
Grenoble Foot 38 players
K Beerschot VA players
Eredivisie players
Eerste Divisie players
Ligue 2 players
Belgian Pro League players
Challenger Pro League players
Expatriate footballers in the Netherlands
Belgian expatriate sportspeople in the Netherlands
Expatriate footballers in France
Belgian expatriate sportspeople in France